Duract is or was a trade name for the following pharmaceutical drugs:

 Bromfenac, a discontinued pain medication
 Dextromethorphan ("Duract Max Strength Cough"), a cough medication